Amina Bibi is a paralympian from Pakistan. She was the first woman to represent the country when she competed at the 2004 Paralympic Games in Athens, Greece.

Career 
Bibi competed in the T11 athletic (track) events. At the Athens Games she placed 4th in her heat in the 100m with a time of 0:24.23. She did not start in the 200m heats.

References 

Living people
Pakistani disabled sportspeople
Paralympic athletes of Pakistan
Athletes (track and field) at the 2004 Summer Paralympics
Year of birth missing (living people)
Pakistani female sprinters